Warren Lee Davis (born June 30, 1943 in Halifax, Virginia) was a Forward/Center for the Anaheim Amigos (1967–68), Los Angeles Stars (1968–70), Pittsburgh Pipers (1970), The Floridians (1970–71), Carolina Cougars (1971–72) and Memphis Pros/Memphis Tams (1972–73) of the American Basketball Association. He was drafted in 1965 by the NBA's New York Knicks in the 6th round (2nd pick, 46th overall).

He was named to the 1969 and 1970 ABA West All-Star Teams.

In 6 seasons he played in 447 Games, played 13,090 Minutes (29.3 per game), had a .480 Field Goal Percentage (2,022 for 4,215), .125 Three Point Field Goal Percentage (2 for 16), .691 Free Throw Percentage (1,403 for 2,030), 4,097 Rebounds (9.2 per game), 944 Assists (2.1 per game) and 5,449 Points (12.2 per game).

External links
Career statistics

1943 births
Living people
Allentown Jets players
American men's basketball players
Anaheim Amigos players
Basketball players from New Jersey
Carolina Cougars players
Centers (basketball)
Los Angeles Stars players
Memphis Pros players
Memphis Tams players
Miami Floridians players
New York Knicks draft picks
North Carolina A&T Aggies men's basketball players
Pittsburgh Pipers players
Power forwards (basketball)
Sportspeople from Atlantic City, New Jersey